Charukeerthi may refer to:

 Bhattarak Charukeerthi, Moodabidri
 Bhattarak Charukeerthi, Shravanabelagola

See also